The 1933 East Tennessee State Teachers football team was an American football team that represented East Tennessee State Teacher's College, Johnson City—now known as East Tennessee State University (ETSU)—as a member of the Smoky Mountain Conference in the 1933 college football season. They were led by second-year head coach Gene McMurray. The 1933 team had by far best record of any team in the program's history with a 6–1–2 mark against the "hardest schedule ever attempted by the school".

Schedule

References

East Tennessee State Teachers
East Tennessee State Buccaneers football seasons
East Tennessee State Teachers football